Dichloroacetamide is a chlorinated derivative of acetamide.

References

Organochlorides
Acetamides